This is a list of notable individuals and organizations who endorsed the campaign of Bongbong Marcos for President of the Philippines and Sara Duterte for Vice President of the Philippines (unless denoted otherwise) in the 2022 Philippine presidential election.

Political endorsements

Presidents 

 Rodrigo Duterte, 16th President of the Philippines (2016–2022), Mayor of Davao City (1988–1998, 2001–2010, 2013–2016), Vice Mayor of Davao City (1986–1987, 2010–2013), Davao City's 1st district representative (1998–2001), National Chairperson of PDP–Laban (2016–present), father of Sara Duterte (no endorsement for president)
 Joseph Estrada, 13th President of the Philippines (1998–2001), 9th Vice President of the Philippines (1992–1998), Senator of the Philippines (1987–1992), Mayor of Manila (2013–2019), Mayor of San Juan, Metro Manila (1969–1986), former film actor
 Gloria Macapagal Arroyo, 14th President of the Philippines (2001–2010), 10th Vice President of the Philippines (1998–2001), Senator of the Philippines (1992–1998), Pampanga's 2nd district representative (2010–2019), Speaker of the Philippine House of Representatives (2018–2019)

Cabinet-level officials 

 Roy Cimatu, Secretary of Environment and Natural Resources (2017–2022), Chief of Staff of the Armed Forces of the Philippines (2002)
 Mike Defensor, Secretary of Environment and Natural Resources (2004–2006), Chairperson of the Housing and Urban Development Coordinating Council (2001–2004), Malacañang Chief of Staff (2006–2007), Anakalusugan party-list representative (2019–present), Quezon City's 3rd district representative (1995–2001), business executive, 2022 Quezon City mayoral candidate under the Partido Federal ng Pilipinas
 Ace Durano, Secretary of Tourism (2004–2010), Cebu's 5th district representative (1998–2004, 2013–2016), 2022 Cebu gubernatorial candidate under Partido Pilipino sa Pagbabago
 Hermogenes Ebdane, Secretary of Public Works and Highways (2007–2009), Governor of Zambales (2019–present), Chief of the Philippine National Police (2002–2004), retired police officer
 Juan Ponce Enrile, Minister of National Defense (1970–1971, 1972–1986), Secretary of Justice (1968–1970), Senator of the Philippines (1987–1992, 1995–2001, 2004–2016), President of the Senate of the Philippines (2008–2013), Philippine Senate Minority Leader (1987–1992, 2013–2014, 2015–2016), Cagayan's 1st district representative (1992–1995)
 Bayani Fernando, Chairperson of the Metro Manila Development Authority (2002–2009), Marikina's 1st district representative (2016–present), Secretary of Public Works and Highways (2003), 2010 vice presidential candidate, Mayor of Marikina, Metro Manila (1992–2001)
 Janette Garin, Secretary of Health (2015–2016), Iloilo's 1st district representative (2019–present)
 Jericho Petilla, Secretary of Energy (2012–2015), Governor of Leyte (2004–2012)
 Harry Roque, Presidential Spokesperson (2017–2018, 2020–2022), Kabayan party-list representative (2016–2017), 2022 senatorial candidate under the UniTeam Alliance
 Mark Villar, Secretary of Public Works and Highways (2016–2021), Las Piñas representative (2010–2016), 2022 senatorial candidate under the UniTeam Alliance
 Arthur Yap, Secretary of Agriculture (2004–2005, 2006–2007), Governor of Bohol (2019–present), Bohol's 3rd district representative (2010–2019)

National-level executive officials and civil servants 
 Anna Mae Lamentillo, chairperson of the Build! Build! Build! committee of the Department of Public Works and Highways, columnist
 Goddess Hope Libiran, former Assistant Secretary of Department of Transportation, columnist
 Gregorio Larrazabal, Commissioner of the Commission on Elections (2009–2011), 2022 Leyte's 4th district congressional candidate
 Marc Red Mariñas, former port operations chief of the Bureau of Immigration, 2022 Muntinlupa mayoral candidate under the People's Reform Party
 Christian Natividad, Chairperson of the Optical Media Board (2020–2021), Mayor of Malolos, Bulacan (2010–2019)
 Mocha Uson, Deputy Administrator of the Overseas Workers Welfare Administration (2019–present), Assistant Secretary for Social Media of the Presidential Communications Group (2017–2019), Movie and Television Review and Classification Board member (2017), singer, actress, dancer, member and co-founder of Mocha Girls, blogger, 2022 representative candidate for the Mothers for Change (MOCHA) party-list (endorsed Isko Moreno for president)

Diplomats 

 Nur Misuari, founder and Chair of the Central Committee of the Moro National Liberation Front (1972–present), Special Economic Envoy to the Organization of Islamic Cooperation (2019–present), President of Bangsamoro Republik (2013), Governor of the Autonomous Region in Muslim Mindanao (1996–2001)

Philippine Congress

Senate 

 Ronald "Bato" dela Rosa, Senator of the Philippines (2019–present), Director-General of the Bureau of Corrections (2018), Chief of the Philippine National Police (2016–2018), city director of the Davao City police (2012–2013), retired police officer
 Win Gatchalian, Senator of the Philippines (2016–present), Valenzuela's 1st district representative (2001–2004, 2013–2016), Mayor of Valenzuela, Metro Manila (2004–2013)
 Bong Go, Senator of the Philippines (2019–present), Special Assistant to the President of the Philippines (2016–2018), personal aide to President Rodrigo Duterte since 1998 
 Imee Marcos, Senator of the Philippines (2019–present), Governor of Ilocos Norte (2010–2019), Ilocos Norte's 2nd district representative (1998–2007), sister of Bongbong Marcos
 Bong Revilla, Senator of the Philippines (2004–2016, 2019–present), Co-chairperson of Lakas–CMD (2013–present), Governor of Cavite (1998–2001), Vice Governor of Cavite (1995–1998), Chairperson of the Videogram Regulatory Board (2002–2004), actor, television host
 Francis Tolentino, Senator of the Philippines (2019–present), Presidential Adviser on Political Affairs (2017–2018), Chairperson of the Metropolitan Manila Development Authority (2010–2015), Mayor of Tagaytay, Cavite (1995–2004)
 Manny Villar, Senator of the Philippines (2001–2013), President of the Senate of the Philippines (2006–2008), Las Piñas–Muntinlupa and Las Piñas (lone) representative (1992–2001), Speaker of the Philippine House of Representatives (1998–2000), 2010 presidential candidate, Chairperson of Vista Land
 Juan Miguel Zubiri, Senator of the Philippines (2007–2011, 2016–present), Philippine Senate Majority Leader (2008–2010, 2018–present), Bukidnon's 3rd district representative (1998–2007), businessman

House of Representatives 

 Ace Barbers, Surigao del Norte's 2nd district representative (1998–2007), Governor of Surigao del Norte (2007–2010)
 Albee Benitez, Negros Occidental's 3rd district representative (2010–2019), 2022 Bacolod mayoralty candidate
 Ferjenel Biron, Iloilo's 4th district representative (2004–2013, 2016–2019)
 Winston Castelo, Quezon City's 2nd district representative (2013—2019), Councilor of Quezon City's 2nd district (2019–present), 2022 Quezon City vice mayoral candidate under the Lakas-CMD
 Christopher de Venecia, Pangasinan's 4th district representative (2016–present), theater director, former actor (endorsed Leni Robredo for president)
 Alan Dujali, Davao del Norte's 2nd district representative (2019–present)
 Paolo Duterte, Davao City's 1st district representative (2019–present), Deputy Speaker of the Philippine House of Representatives (2019–2020), Vice Mayor of Davao City (2013–2018), brother of Sara Duterte
 Conrado Estrella III, Abono Partylist Representative (2013–present), Deputy Speaker of the Philippine House of Representatives (2019–present), Pangasinan's 6th District representative (1987-1995, 2001-2010)
 Rodolfo Fariñas, Ilocos Norte's 1st district representative (1998–2001, 2010–2019), Majority Floor Leader of the Philippine House of Representatives (2016–2018), Governor of Ilocos Norte (1988–1998), Mayor of Laoag, Ilocos Norte (1980–1986)
 Juliet Marie Ferrer, Negros Occidental's 4th district representative (2016–present), former Mayor of La Carlota, Negros Occidental
 Richard Garin, Iloilo's 1st congressional district representative (2013–2019)
 Aurelio Gonzales Jr., Pampanga's 3rd district representative (2007–2013, 2016–present)
 Precious Hipolito-Castelo, Quezon City's 2nd district representative (2019–present), actress, newscaster
 Julio Ledesma IV, Negros Occidental's 1st district representative (2007–2016)
 Manny Lopez, Manila's 1st district representative (2016–present), President of the Amateur Boxing Association of the Philippines (1993–2009), former vice president of the Philippine Olympic Committee
 Dale Malapitan, Caloocan's 1st district representative (2016–present)
 Rodante Marcoleta, Sagip party-list representative (2016–present), Alagad party-list representative (2004–2013), former senatorial candidate of the UniTeam Alliance
 Imelda Marcos, First Lady of the Philippines (1965–1986), Governor of Metro Manila (1975–1986), Minister of the Interim Batasang Pambansa for Region IV (1978–1984), 1992 presidential candidate, Leyte's 1st district representative (1995–1998), Ilocos Norte's 2nd district representative (2010–2019), mother of Bongbong Marcos
 Eric Martinez, Valenzuela's 2nd district representative (2016–present), Vice Mayor of Valenzuela (2007–2016), Valenzuela's 2nd district councilor (2001-2007)
 Henry Oaminal, Misamis Occidental's 2nd district representative (2013–present), Deputy Speaker of the Philippine House of Representatives (2019–present), 2022 Misamis Occidental gubernatorial candidate
 Jose L. Ong, Jr., Northern Samar's 2nd District representative (1987–1992; 2019–present), Governor of Northern Samar (2013–2019)
 Pablo Ortega, La Union's 1st district representative (2016–present), Mayor of San Fernando, La Union (2007–2016)
 Paz Radaza, Lapu-Lapu City representative (2019–present), 2022 Lakas–CMD candidate for Mayor of Lapu-Lapu City, Cebu
 Gilbert Remulla, Cavite's 2nd district representative (2001–2007), journalist 
 Jesus Crispin Remulla, Cavite's 7th district representative (2010–2013, 2019–present), Deputy Speaker of the Philippine House of Representatives (2010–2013), Cavite's 3rd district representative (2004–2010), Governor of Cavite (2016–2019) 
 Rufus Rodriguez, Cagayan de Oro's 2nd district representative (2007–2016, 2019–present), Deputy Speaker of the Philippine House of Representatives (2020–present), Commissioner of the Bureau of Immigration (1998–2001), lawyer (endorsed Leni Robredo for president)
 Xavier Jesus Romualdo, Camiguin representative (2013–present), 2022 Camiguin gubernatorial candidate
 Ricky Sandoval, Malabon representative (2016–2019), Malabon–Navotas representative (1998–2007)
 Joey Salceda, Albay's 2nd district representative (2016–present), Governor of Albay (2007–2016), Malacañang Chief of Staff (2007), Albay's 3rd district representative (1998–2007) (endorsed Leni Robredo for president)
 John Rey Tiangco, Navotas representative (2019–present), Mayor of Navotas, Metro Manila (2010–2019)
 Abraham Tolentino, Cavite's 8th district representative (2019–present), Deputy Speaker of the Philippine House of Representatives (2020–present), President of the Philippine Olympic Committee (2019–present), Cavite's 7th district representative (2013–2019), Mayor of Tagaytay, Cavite (2004–2013)
 Lucy Torres-Gomez, Leyte's 4th district representative (2010–2013, 2013–present), actress, television host, 2022 Ormoc mayoral candidate under the PDP–Laban
 Juliette Uy, Misamis Oriental's 2nd district representative (2013–present) (endorsed Leni Robredo for president)
 Gerardo Valmayor Jr., Negros Occidental's 1st district representative (2019–present)
 Lord Allan Velasco, Marinduque representative (2010–2013, 2016–present), Speaker of the Philippine House of Representatives (2020–present) (has openly endorsed Duterte only)
 Luis Raymund Villafuerte, Camarines Sur's 2nd district representative (2016–present), Governor of Camarines Sur (2004–2013) (no endorsement for president)
 Victor Yap, Tarlac's 2nd district representative (2016–present), Governor of Tarlac (2007–2016), Mayor of Victoria, Tarlac (1988–1998)
 Manuel "Way Kurat" Zamora, Davao de Oro's 1st district representative (2001–2010, 2019–present), Vice Governor of Compostela Valley (2013–2019)

Local government officials

Provincial officials 

 Mamintal Alonto Adiong Jr., Governor of Lanao del Sur (2007–2016, 2019–present), Vice Governor of Lanao del Sur (2016–2019)
 Karen Agapay, Vice Governor of Laguna (2016–present)
 Rodolfo Albano III, Governor of Isabela (2019–present), Isabela's 1st district representative (1998–2001, 2004–2010, 2013–2019), Vice Governor of Isabela (2010–2013)
 Maria Jocelyn Bernos, Governor of Abra (2016–present), Abra representative (2010–2016)
 Rhodora Cadiao, Governor of Antique (2015–present), Vice Governor of Antique (2004–2010, 2013–2015)
 Nancy Catamco, Governor of North Cotabato
 Esteban Evan Contreras, Governor of Capiz (2019–present), Vice Governor of Capiz (2010–2019)
 Dale Corvera, Governor of Agusan del Norte (2019–present), Mayor of Cabadbaran, Agusan del Norte (2007–2016), Vice Governor of Agusan del Norte (2004–2007)
 Dakila Cua, Governor of Quirino (2019–present), Quirino's 1st district representative (2010–2019), Union of Local Authorities of the Philippines President
 Jerry Dalipog, Governor of Ifugao (2019–present), Mayor of Banaue, Ifugao (2016–2019)
 Roel Degamo, Governor of Negros Oriental (2011–present), Vice Governor of Negros Oriental (2010–2011)
 Anthony del Rosario, Governor of Davao del Norte (2006–2019), Hugpong ng Pagbabago Secretary-General
 Melchor Diclas, Governor of Benguet (2019–present), Mayor of Buguias, Benguet (2016–2019)
 Imelda Dimaporo, Governor of Lanao del Norte (1998–2007), Lanao del Norte's 1st district representative (2010–2016)
 Rogelio Espina, Governor of Biliran (2001–2010, 2019–present), Biliran's at-large district representative (2010–2019)
 Jeffrey Ferrer, Vice Governor of Negros Occidental
 Eduardo Gadiano, Governor of Occidental Mindoro (2013–present), Mayor of Sablayan, Occidental Mindoro (2010–2019)
 Albert Garcia, Governor of Bataan (2013–present), Bataan's 2nd district representative (2004–2013)
 Gwendolyn Garcia, Governor of Cebu (2004–2013, 2019–present), Cebu's 3rd district representative (2010–2019)
 Ramil Hernandez, Governor of Laguna (2016–present), Vice Governor of Laguna (2007–2010, 2010–2014)
 Antonio Kho, Governor of Masbate (2016–present)
 Bonifacio Lacwasan, Governor of Mountain Province (2016–present)
 Mark Ronald Lambino, Vice Governor of Pangasinan (2016–present)
 Mark Leviste, Vice Governor of Batangas (2007–2016, 2019–present), Batangas Provincial Board member (2004–2007)
 Manuel Mamba, Governor of Cagayan (2016–present)
 Hermilando Mandanas, Governor of Batangas (1995–2004, 2016–present), Batangas's 2nd district representative (2004–2013)
 Emmy Lou Taliño-Mendoza, Vice Governor of North Cotabato
 Matthew Manotoc, Governor of Ilocos Norte (2019–present), Ilocos Norte Provincial Board member (2016–2019), nephew of Bongbong Marcos
 Damian Mercado, Governor of Southern Leyte (2007–2013, 2016–present), Southern Leyte representative (2013–2016), Mayor of Maasin, Southern Leyte (1998–2007)
 Bai Mariam Mangudadatu, Governor of Maguindanao
 Suharto Mangudadatu, Governor of Sultan Kudarat
 Florencio Miraflores, Governor of Aklan (2013–present)
 Francisco Emmanuel Ortega III, Governor of La Union (2016–present)
 Francisco "Paolo" Ortega, La Union Provincial Board member
 Leopoldo Petilla, Governor of Leyte (2013–present)
 Alexander Pimentel, Governor of Surigao del Sur (2019–present), Mayor of Tandag, Surigao del Sur (2014–2013, 2016–2019)
 Dennis Pineda, Governor of Pampanga (2019–present), Vice Governor of Pampanga (2013–2019), Mayor of Lubao, Pampanga (2001–2010)
 Lilia Pineda, Vice Governor of Pampanga (2019–present), Governor of Pampanga (2010–2019), Mayor of Lubao, Pampanga (1992–2001)
 Jonvic Remulla, Governor of Cavite (2010–2016, 2019–present), Vice Governor of Cavite (1998–2007)
 Jose Riano, Governor of Romblon (2019–present)
 Yshmael Sali, Governor of Tawi-Tawi (2019–present), Mayor of Languyan, Tawi-Tawi (2013–2019)
 Chavit Singson, Governor of Ilocos Sur (1972–1986, 1992–2001, 2004–2007, 2010–2013), Mayor of Narvacan, Ilocos Sur (2019–present), Ilocos Sur's 1st district representative (1987–1992), founding chairman of LCS Holdings, President of the Philippine National Shooting Association (2018–present)
 Ryan Luis Singson, Governor of Ilocos Sur (2013–present)
 Danilo Suarez, Governor of Quezon (2019–present), Quezon's 3rd district representative (1992–2001, 2004–2013, 2016–2019), Minority Floor Leader of the Philippine House of Representatives (2012–2013, 2016–2019), columnist
 Edgar Tallado, Governor of Camarines Norte (2010–present)
 Reynaldo Tamayo Jr., Governor of South Cotabato, president of the Partido Federal ng Pilipinas
 Abdusakur Mahail Tan, Governor of Sulu (2007–2013, 2019–present), Vice Governor of Sulu (2013–2016), Sulu's 1st district representative (1996–2001)
 Philip Tan, Governor of Misamis Occidental
 Reynolds Michael Tan, Governor of Samar (2019–present), Vice Governor of Samar (2019)
 Ferdinand Tubban, Governor of Kalinga (2019–present)
 Jayvee Uy, Governor of Davao de Oro (2016–present)
 Roberto Uy, Governor of Zamboanga del Norte (2013–present), Mayor of Dipolog, Zamboanga del Norte (1998–2007)
 Zaldy Villa, Governor of Siquijor (2013–present)
 Christoperson Yap, Vice Governor of Southern Leyte (2016–present)
 Susan Yap, Governor of Tarlac (2013–present)
 Rebecca Ynares, Governor of Rizal (2001–2004, 2013–present)
 Jose Maria Zubiri Jr., Governor of Bukidnon (2001–2010, 2013–present), Vice Governor of Bukidnon (2010–2013), Bukidnon's 3rd district representative (1987–1998), businessman

Local officials 

 Melanie Abarientos, Mayor of Del Gallego, Camarines Sur
 Leonardo Agos, Mayor of Gainza, Camarines Sur
 Jose Maria Alonso, Mayor of Pontevedra, Negros Occidental
 John Paul Alvarez, Mayor of Ilog, Negros Occidental
 Cristy Angeles, Mayor of Tarlac City, Tarlac
 Jose Nadie Arceo, Mayor of Hinigaran, Negros Occidental
 Katrina Ballandres, Mayor of Kabasalan, Zamboanga Sibugay
 Francisco A. Barzaga, Councilor of Dasmariñas, Cavite
 Herbert Bautista, Mayor of Quezon City, Metro Manila (2010–2019), actor, 2022 senatorial candidate under the UniTeam Alliance
 Iyo Bernardo, Vice Mayor of Pasig, Metro Manila (2013–present)
 Florencio Bernabe, Jr., Mayor of Parañaque, Metro Manila (2004–2013)
 Cicero Borromeo, Mayor of Candoni, Negros Occidental
 Elisa Candingan, Mayor of Hinundayan, Southern Leyte
 Cris Castro, Councilor of Pandi, Bulacan
 Beng Climaco, Mayor of Zamboanga City (2013–present), Zamboanga City's 2nd district representative (2007–2013), Vice Mayor of Zamboanga City (2004–2007) (endorsed Leni Robredo for president)
 Sonny Coscolluela, former Mayor of Murcia, Negros Occidental
 Ambrocio Cruz, Jr., Mayor of Guiguinto, Bulacan
 Oliver Dator, Mayor of Lucban, Quezon
 Jessie de Jesus, Mayor of Calumpit, Bulacan
 Laurence Marxlen dela Cruz, Mayor of Salvador Benedicto, Negros Occidental
 Sebastian Duterte, Vice Mayor of Davao City (2019–present)
 Mauricio Domogan, Mayor of Baguio, Benguet (1992–2001, 2010–2019), Baguio representative (2001–2010)
 Marilyn Era, Mayor of Calatrava, Negros Occidental
 Manuel Escalante III, Mayor of Manapla, Negros Occidental
 Jose Espinosa III, former mayor of Iloilo City, 2022 Iloilo City's at-large congressional district candidate
 Ernesto Estrao, Mayor of Hinoba-an, Negros Occidental
 Ferdinand Estrella, Mayor of Baliuag, Bulacan
 Christina Frasco, Mayor of Liloan, Cebu (2016–present)
 Majul Gandamra, Mayor of Marawi, Lanao del Sur
 Jeffrey Ganzon, Vice Mayor of Iloilo City
 Jennifer Garin, Mayor of Guimbal, Iloilo
 Rex Gatchalian, Mayor of Valenzuela, Metro Manila (2013–present), 2022 NPC candidate for Valenzuela's 1st district representative
 Mark Andrew Arthur Golez, Mayor of Silay, Negros Occidental
 Richard Gomez, Mayor of Ormoc, Leyte (2016–present), actor, model, television personality, 2022 PDP–Laban candidate for Leyte's 4th district representative
 Eladio Gonzales, Mayor of Balagtas, Bulacan
 Renato Gustilo, Mayor of San Carlos, Negros Occidental
 Migay Ibasco, Mayor of Bula, Camarines Sur
 Rex Jalandoon, Mayor of La Carlota, Negros Occidental
 Richard Jaojoco, Mayor of Toboso, Negros Occidental
 Francis Albert Juan, Mayor of Bustos, Bulacan
 William Lachica, former mayor of Kalibo, Aklan
 Nelson Legaspi, Mayor of Canaman, Camarines Sur
 Chris Lizardo, Mayor of Minalabac, Camarines Sur
 Nilo Jesus Antonio Neil Lizares III, Mayor of Talisay, Negros Occidental
 Fermin Mabulo, Mayor of San Fernando, Camarines Sur
 Marvin Malacon, Mayor of Enrique B. Magalona, Negros Occidental
 Oscar Malapitan, Mayor of Caloocan, Metro Manila (2013–present), Caloocan's 1st district representative (2004–2013), Vice Mayor of Caloocan (1998–2001), Councilor of Caloocan (1992–1998)
 Rhumyla Nicor-Mangilimutan, Mayor of La Castellana, Negros Occidental
 Raulito Manlapaz, Mayor of Hagonoy, Bulacan
 Mary Ann Marcos, Mayor of Paombong, Bulacan
 Nerivi Santos-Martinez, Mayor of Talavera, Nueva Ecija
 Vergel Meneses, Mayor of Bulakan, Bulacan (2019–present), former basketball player and head coach (JRU Heavy Bombers, Pop Cola Panthers, Barangay Ginebra Kings)
 Lani Mercado, Mayor of Bacoor, Cavite (2016–present), Cavite's 2nd district representative (2010–2016), actress, 2022 Lakas–CMD candidate for Cavite's 2nd district representative
 Nacional Mercado, Mayor of Maasin, Southern Leyte
 Alejandro Mirasol, Mayor of Binalbagan, Negros Occidental
 Enrique Miravelles, Mayor of Valladolid, Negros Occidental
 Irene Montilla, Mayor of Isabela, Negros Occidental
 Mannix Ortega, Vice Mayor of San Juan, La Union
 Francis Frederick Palanca, Mayor of Victorias, Negros Occidental
 Miguel Antonio Peña, Mayor of Pulupandan, Negros Occidental
 Russel Pleyto, Mayor of Santa Maria, Bulacan
 Carl Jason Rama Bautista, Mayor of Kiblawan, Davao del Sur; 2022 Davao del Sur gubernatorial candidate
 Mike Rama, Mayor of Cebu City (2010–2016, 2021–present), Vice Mayor of Cebu City (2001–2010, 2019–2021)
 Edgardo Ramos, Mayor of Pila, Laguna
 Arthur Robes, Mayor of San Jose del Monte, Bulacan
 Victor Gerardo Rojas, Mayor of Murcia, Negros Occidental
 Weny Sabalbero, Mayor of Cabusao, Camarines Sur
 Jeannie Sandoval, former Vice Mayor of Malabon
 Jose Santiago, Mayor of Bocaue, Bulacan
 Edwin Santos, Mayor of Obando, Bulacan
 Ed Severo, Mayor of Calabanga, Camarines Sur
 Ricardo Silvestre, Mayor of Marilao, Bulacan
 John Rey Tabujara, Mayor of Cauayan, Negros Occidental
 Donya Tesoro, Mayor of San Manuel, Tarlac (2019–present), Vice Mayor of San Manuel (2016–2019)
 Toby Tiangco, Mayor of Navotas, Metro Manila (2000–2010, 2019–present), Navotas representative (2010–2019), Vice Mayor of Navotas (1998, 1999–2000), 2022 Partido Navoteño candidate for Navotas representative
 Roderick Tiongson, Mayor of San Miguel, Bulacan
 Rogelio Raymund Tongson Jr., Mayor of Himamaylan, Negros Occidental
 Jilson D. Tubillara, Mayor of San Enrique, Negros Occidental
 Peter Unabia, Vice Mayor of Gingoog, Misamis Oriental; 2022 Misamis Oriental gubernatorial candidate
 De Carlo "Oyo" Uy, former Councilor of Tagum, Davao del Norte
 Linabelle Villarica, Mayor of Meycauayan, Bulacan
 Cipriano Violago Jr., Mayor of San Rafael, Bulacan
 Anastacia Vistan, Mayor of Plaridel, Bulacan
 Melecio Yap Jr., Mayor of Escalante, Negros Occidental (2007–2016, 2019–present)
 Cecilio Ynares, Vice Mayor of Binangonan, Rizal (2016–present), Mayor of Binangonan, Rizal (2007–2016)
 Cesar Ynares, Mayor of Binangonan, Rizal (1998–2007, 2016–present)
 Ella Celestina Yulo, Mayor of Moises Padilla, Negros Occidental
 Nicholas Yulo, Mayor of Bago, Negros Occidental (2016–present)
 Francis Zamora, Mayor of San Juan, Metro Manila (2019–present), Vice Mayor of San Juan (2010–2016), Councilor of San Juan (2007–2010), former basketball player (De La Salle Green Archers)

Military and police officials

High-rank officials 

 Danilo Abinoja, Commandant of the Philippine Coast Guard (2007–2008)
 Damian Carlos, Commandant of the Philippine Coast Guard (2006–2007)
 Benjamin Defensor Jr., Chief of Staff of the Armed Forces of the Philippines (2002)
 Avelino Razon Jr., Chief of the Philippine National Police (2007–2008)
 Dionisio Santiago, Chief of Staff of the Armed Forces of the Philippines (2002–2003)
 Felimon Santos Jr., Chief of Staff of the Armed Forces of the Philippines (2020)

Medal of Valor awardees 

Noel Buan, Brigadier general of the Philippine Army (2004)
Roy Cuenca, Staff Sergeant of the Philippine Army (1991)
Lucio Curig, Staff Sergeant of the Philippine Army (2000)
Leopoldo Diokno, Staff Sergeant of the Philippine Army (2004)
Hilario Estrella, Colonel of the Philippine Army (2014)
Bienvenido Fajemolin, Sergeant of the Philippine Army (1977)
Francisco Granfil, Sergeant of the Philippine Army (1988)
Ariel Querubin, Colonel of the Philippine Marine Corps (2000–2010)
Robert Salvador, Captain of the Philippine Army (2016)

Service and area commanders 
 John S. Bonafos, retired lieutenant general of the Philippine Army
 Emamanuel R. Carta, retired lieutenant general of the Philippine Army
 Eugenio V. Cedo, retired lieutenant general of the Philippine Army
 Jaime de los Santos, Commanding General of the Philippine Army (2001–2002), Superintendent of the Philippine Military Academy, Supreme Commander of the United Nations' International Force East Timor (INTERFET), Supreme Commander of the United Nations Transitional Administration in East Timor (UNTAET)
 Ireneo C. Espino, retired lieutenant general of the Philippine Army
 Rene V. Medina, vice admiral of the Philippine Navy, executive director of the STCW Office of the Maritime Industry Authority
 Raul S. Urgello, lieutenant general of the Philippine Army (1998–1999)

General and service officers 

 Alphonsus P. Crucero, former major general of the Philippine Army
 Prospero C. Noble Jr., former major general of the Philippine National Police

Political parties, organizations, and alliances 

 Barug Alang sa Kauswagan ug Demokrasya
 Hugpong ng Pagbabago
 Kilusang Bagong Lipunan
 Labor Party Philippines
 Lakas–CMD
 League of Municipal Mayors-Cebu
 Malayang Quezon City
 Moro Islamic Liberation Front (endorsed Leni Robredo for president) 
 Moro National Liberation Front (except from its Chairman Muslimim Sema, minister of Labor and Employment of Bangsamoro)
 Nacionalista Party
 National Unity Party (except from its president Elpidio Barzaga Jr. who endorsed Leni Robredo)
 One Cebu (except for its 3rd district officials who are endorsing Isko Moreno)
 PDP–Laban (Cusi faction)
 Partido Federal ng Pilipinas
 Partido Pilipino sa Pagbabago
 Philippine Councilors League
 Pwersa ng Masang Pilipino
 Reform Party
 Tawi-Tawi One Party
 United Nationalist Democratic Organization

Non-political endorsements

Business executives and leaders 
 Dioceldo Sy, founder and owner of Ever Bilena and Blackwater Bossing

Media personalities 

 Bayani Agbayani, comedian, actor, singer, television host
 Aegis (band), rock band
 Archie Alemania, actor
 Isay Alvarez, theatre actress
 Andrew E., rapper, record producer
 Cat Arambulo-Antonio, socialite, social media influencer
 Nora Aunor, actress
 Claudine Barretto, actress, 2022 PDP–Laban candidate for Councilor of Olongapo
 Paolo Bediones, television host, news anchor
 Geneva Cruz, singer, former member of Smokey Mountain, sergeant 
 Cueshé, pop rock band
 Ai-Ai delas Alas, actress, comedienne
 DJ Loonyo, disc jockey, dancer, model, actor, choreographer, social media influencer formerly based in China
 Bugoy Drilon, singer-songwriter, actor
 Dulce, singer, actress
 Karla Estrada, actress, host, 2022 representative candidate for the Tingog party-list
 Ex Battalion, Filipino hip hop group
 Jason Fernandez, lead vocal and guitarist of Rivermaya (2007–2011)
 Pops Fernandez, singer, entrepreneur, entertainer, television host, actress
 Lyca Gairanod, singer, actress, The Voice Kids winner
 Toni Gonzaga, actress, host, singer, vlogger
 Members of the rock band Hagibis
 Katrina Halili, actress
 Mike Hanopol, singer, former bass guitarist of the Juan de la Cruz Band, rabbi
 Mark Herras, actor, dancer
 Kris Lawrence, singer-songwriter
 Diego Loyzaga, actor
 Aiko Melendez, actress, Councilor of Quezon City from the 2nd district (2001–2010)
 Cesar Montano, actor, film producer, director
 Daryl Ong, singer-songwriter
 Elizabeth Oropesa, actress
 Daphne Oseña-Paez, television personality, news reporter, author, UNICEF Goodwill Ambassador
 Robin Padilla, actor, 2022 senatorial candidate under the UniTeam Alliance
 Michael Pangilinan, singer-songwriter, actor, model
 Plethora, band
 Roderick Paulate, actor
 Rufa Mae Quinto, actress, singer, comedienne, host
 Willie Revillame, television host, singer, businessman
 Richard Reynoso, recording artist, singer, producer, director, host
 Beverly Salviejo, actress
 Salbakuta, Filipino Rap Group formed by Andrew E.
 Isko "Brod Pete" Salvador, actor, comedian
 Randy Santiago, actor, comedian, singer, songwriter
 Gerald Santos, actor, singer
 Robert Seña, theatre actor
 Paul Soriano, director, producer
 Vivian Velez, Director-General of the Film Academy of the Philippines, actress (endorsed Isko Moreno for president)
 Renz Verano, singer
 Cris Villonco, singer, theater actress, granddaughter of Armida Siguion-Reyna
 Darryl Yap, director, writer
 Dawn Zulueta, actress

Sports figures 
 Jean Asis, volleyball player (FEU Tamaraws)
 Ash Cañete, volleyball player (FEU Tamaraws)
 Lycha Ebon, volleyball player (FEU Tamaraws)
 Michele Gumabao, volleyball player (De La Salle Lady Spikers, Creamline Cool Smashers), beauty queen (Miss Globe 2018, Miss Universe Philippines 2020), 2022 representative candidate for the Mothers for Change (MOCHA) party-list
 Shiela Kiseo, volleyball player (FEU Tamaraws)
 Niks Medina, volleyball player (FEU Tamaraws)
 Arwind Santos, basketball player (FEU Tamaraws, NorthPort Batang Pier)
 Chen Tagaod, volleyball player (FEU Tamaraws)

Other public figures 

 Jeffrey "Ka Eric" Celiz, former New People's Army cadre, 2022 Abante Sambayanan party-list nominee
 Larry Gadon, lawyer, 2022 senatorial candidate under the UniTeam Alliance
 Alex Lopez, lawyer, 2022 Manila mayoral candidate under the Partido Federal ng Pilipinas
 Sandro Marcos, 2022 representative candidate for Ilocos Norte's 1st district, son of Bongbong Marcos
 Apollo Quiboloy, pastor, church leader of the Kingdom of Jesus Christ
 Mike Velarde, founder and "Servant Leader" of El Shaddai

Organizations

Advocacy groups 
 Advocates and Keepers Organization of OFWS (AKO-OFW)
 Alyansang Duterte-Bongbong
 BAROG 2.0 (Batan-on Alang kay Rody Gihapon)
 Filipinos for Peace, Justice and Prosperity Movement 
 People's Patriotic Movement
 Movement for Reform and Regional Development toward New Economic Cultural Cooperation

Cooperatives 

 National Federation of Transport Cooperative

Educational institutions 
 University of Manila
 University of Perpetual Help System

Fraternity groups 

Scouts Royale Brotherhood International Service Fraternity and Sorority

LGBTQ+ groups 
 LGBT Pilipinas
 United Beki of the Philippines

Religious groups and Christian movements 
 El Shaddai (movement)
 Iglesia ni Cristo
 Independent Bishops Conference of the Philippines

Trade unions 
Trade Union Congress of the Philippines

Transport groups 
 Liga ng Transportasyon at Operators sa Pilipinas
 Motorcycle Federation of the Philippines, Inc.
 Tricycle Operators and Drivers Association of the Philippines Inc.

Sectorial groups 
 United Lights of Pangasinan
 Visayas for Isko-Sara (VISA) (endorsed Isko Moreno for president)

See also 
 List of Leni Robredo 2022 presidential campaign endorsements

References 

2022 Philippine presidential campaigns
Philippines politics-related lists